Artyom Valeryevich Delkin (born 2 August 1990) is a Russian professional football player. He plays as a forward for FC Volgar Astrakhan.

Club career
He made his Russian Football National League debut for FC Krylia Sovetov Samara on 22 July 2012 in a game against FC Terek Grozny.

External links
 

1990 births
Sportspeople from Samara, Russia
Living people
Russian footballers
Russia youth international footballers
Russia under-21 international footballers
Association football forwards
FC Tolyatti players
FC Nizhny Novgorod (2007) players
FC KAMAZ Naberezhnye Chelny players
FC Torpedo Vladimir players
PFC Krylia Sovetov Samara players
FC Tyumen players
FC Orenburg players
FC Tambov players
FC Nizhny Novgorod (2015) players
FC Yenisey Krasnoyarsk players
FC Akron Tolyatti players
FC Volgar Astrakhan players
Russian Premier League players
Russian First League players
Russian Second League players